If It Moves, Shoot It! is a video game developed by Irish studio Emerald Software and published by Martech in 1988 published by Broderbund in 1989 for the Amiga. An DOS port was released in 1989 in North America by Broderbund.

Plot
If It Moves, Shoot It! is an arcade-style shoot 'em up where the player attacks everything that comes on-screen. The player battles the Korts, hoping to free lost settlers in the Valley of the Ancients.

Gameplay
The game can be played using a joystick or keyboard.

Reception
The game was reviewed in 1991 in Dragon #166 by Hartley, Patricia, and Kirk Lesser in "The Role of Computers" column. The reviewers gave the game 3 out of 5 stars.

Reviews
The Games Machine - Mar, 1989
The One - Dec, 1988
ACE (Advanced Computer Entertainment) - Feb, 1989
Amiga User International - Mar, 1989
ACE (Advanced Computer Entertainment) - Mar, 1989
Computer and Video Games - Mar, 1989

References

External links
If It Moves, Shoot It! at MobyGames
If It Moves, Shoot It! at IGN
If It Moves, Shoot It! at GameFAQs
If It Moves, Shoot It! at GameSpot
Review in Compute!

1988 video games
Amiga games
Broderbund games
DOS games
Martech games
Shoot 'em ups
Video games developed in Ireland